Kapitán Nemo is a Czech science fiction novel, written by J. M. Troska. It was first published in 1939.

Adventurers seeking the location of the legendary Atlantis are captured by Captain Nemo, the antihero from Jules Verne's novel, Twenty Thousand Leagues Under the Sea. Nemo has established an underground empire on the ruins of the lost civilization and has an immense army of robots.

1939 novels
Czech science fiction novels
1939 science fiction novels
Underwater civilizations in fiction
Atlantis in fiction
Novels about robots
Underwater novels